Rhodopetoma erosa is a species of sea snail, a marine gastropod mollusk in the family Pseudomelatomidae.

Rhodopetoma erosa auct. non Schrenk, 1867 is a synonym of Propebela nobilis (Möller, 1842)

Description
This marine species reaches 18 mm in length, its diameter 6.6 mm.

The shell is longitudinally ribbed and spirally striated. There is a narrow band at the suture brown, with sometimes a darker band at the
suture and another at the base.

Distribution
This species occurs off Japan and Korea.

References

 Schrenck, L.I. (1867) Mollusken des Amur-Landes und des Nordjapanischen Meeres. Reisen und Forschung im Amur-Landes in den Jahren 1854–1856

External links
 
 
 HABE, Tadashige (1958), The Fauna of Akkeshi Bay : XXV. Gastropoda (With Plates I-V); Publications from the Akkeshi Marine Biological Station, 8: 2-39

erosa
Gastropods described in 1862